Sant Adrià de Besòs is a city and a municipality within the comarca of Barcelonès in Catalonia, north-eastern Spain. It is situated on the Mediterranean coast, at the mouth of river Besòs, extending to both sides of the estuary although the original settlement with the parish church lies on the left bank of the river, in the northern part of town. Sant Adrià is the smallest municipality of Barcelonès and has close ties with the neighbouring cities of Barcelona, Badalona and Santa Coloma de Gramenet, forming a uniform urban area within Barcelona metropolitan area.

The municipality straddles major transportation networks and is served by several modes of public transport. Sant Adrià is currently a town dominated by the service sector, but with a diverse manufacturing sector (especially in the areas of metal-work, chemistry, and construction) consisting mostly of medium-sized companies. Historically, it has experienced several massive migration flows attracted by the important industrialisation of the area during the last century and has been subject of various major urban redevelopments. In 2004, Sant Adrià de Besòs was part of the Universal Forum of Cultures.

History
The origins of the town are linked to the parish church of Sant Adrià de Besòs, which was referred to in 1012, where in about 1092 a priory of Augustinian monks, dependants of Sant Ruf d'Avinyo, was founded. Saint Olegarius (San José María de Porcioles) came to this priory from 1095 to 1108 before becoming the bishop of Barcelona and, later, the archbishop of Tarragona. In 1127 the priory was moved to Santa Maria de Terrassa. Surrounding this church, upon a small hill fourteen metres high, to the west of the River Besòs, is the nucleus of the original village.

Transport
Given its proximity to the city of Barcelona, Sant Adrià de Besòs is well served by road, rail and many other forms of public transport, becoming an important part of the transportation network in Barcelona metropolitan area. The city has always been an economically unprivileged town and a really dense area, and it remained indifferent to the establishment and the improvement of public transport around Barcelona for many years, but the recent development in public infrastructures and urban renewals has brought substantial transport improvement, especially in the form of tram services.

C-31 highway comes directly from Plaça de les Glòries Catalanes in Barcelona to Mataró and intersects perpendicularly with Ronda del Litoral (B-10 motorway) in the middle of town, forming a major highway interchange, and allowing B-10 to be linked with Ronda de Dalt (B-20 motorway) at Nus de la Trinitat, another major highway interchange in northern Barcelona. Other main roads serving Sant Adrià include the national route N-II parallel to Maresme's coastline and the local road BV-5001 towards Montornès del Vallès and La Roca del Vallès, crossing the northern part of the municipality.

Public transportation network is mainly composed of several urban and interurban bus routes that provide a good internal connection within the municipality as well as the connection of the city to other nearby cities within the comarca. Currently, 16 bus routes run through the municipality, 5 of them are local bus routes operated by Transports Metropolitans de Barcelona (TMB) to and from Barcelona, 8 are interurban routes within Barcelonès, and 3 are night routes. With regard to rail transport modes, Trambesòs is the most prominent transport system in Sant Adrià which comprises 7 stops within the municipality served by all its routes, linking the city to the district of Sant Martí up to Parc de la Ciutadella in Barcelona. Maresme Line also runs through the city with Sant Adrià de Besòs railway station as the only stop of the line in town which lies in the eastern part of Sant Adrià and is served by Rodalies de Catalunya commuter rail line R1. Verneda is the only Barcelona Metro station officially located in the municipality, but Artigues – Sant Adrià station is as its name says also meant to serve Sant Adrià de Besòs because although being located in Badalona, it is just a few meters from the city limits.

Places of interest
 History of Immigration in Catalonia Museum (MhiC): This museum aims to analyse the history of the migratory processes related to Catalonia, mainly from the Iberian Peninsula. It comprises a hall for temporary exhibitions as well as a documentation center, a virtual museum and El Sevillano, a restored passenger railcar used during the 1950s and 1960s by many immigrants to get to Barcelona from southern Spain.
 Parish Church of Sant Adrià de Besòs: Built during the 1940s, this church consists of a building with a brick veneer façade, and a large nave which has chapels on each side, a semicircular apse and a dome. The façade is flanked by two towers, of which the highest one is the bell tower.
 Air-raid shelter: The air-raid shelter of Francesc Macià Square (RapM) is one of the four public air-raid shelters built during the Spanish Civil War in the city. It is situated under Francesc Macià Square and very close to the former textile factory Industrial Baurier since factories were military targets. This air-raid shelter had capacity for 80 or 100 people and it was finished building in August 1938 but was not closed in Francoist Spain until March 1939. It was reopened on 11 September 2006 after rehabilitation and it was not turned into a museum until 27 January 2008. Currently, the RapM is divided into five exhibition spaces with an entrance hall, and is designed as a teaching tool to think over the Civil War and the post-war in Sant Adrià.

Climate

Demography

Photo gallery

Notable people
 Monkey Black (1986–2014) Rapper born in the Dominican Republic. He lived in Sant Adrià de Besòs where he was murder in 2014.
 Isabel Coixet (1962–), film director, born in Sant Adrià
 Javier Pérez Andújar (1965–), writer, born in Sant Adrià

References

External links

  
 Government data pages 

 
Populated places in Barcelonès